Santino Stillitano (Saronno, 	26 June 1969) is an Italian ice sledge hockey goaltender.

Career 
Stillitano suffers from agenesis in his right leg. 

He started playing ice sledge hockey in 2006, after the 2006 Winter Paralympics in Turin, with the Armata Brancaleone Varese of the Italian para ice hockey championship.

Already in 2007, he was called up to join the Italy national para ice hockey team.

With the Azzurri, he took part in four editions of the Paralympic Winter Games (Vancouver 2010, Sochi 2014, Pyeongchang 2018 and Beijing 2022, where he was the oldest athlete of the Italian expedition) and nine World Championships, in addition to winning two European medals: gold in 2011 and silver in 2016.

References

External links 
 

1969 births
Living people
Italian sledge hockey players
Paralympic sledge hockey players of Italy